Charles Minot "Minnie" Dole (April 18, 1899 – March 14, 1976) was the founder of the National Ski Patrol.

Biography
Dole was born April 18, 1899, in Tyngsboro, Massachusetts. He learned how to ski in the Boy Scouts of America and attended Phillips Academy.  Though he enlisted in the US Army during World War I, the war finished before he completed his basic training.  Following the War, he graduated from Yale University in 1923.

Minnie Dole formed the National Ski Patrol in 1938 and was director of the organization until 1950.

During World War II, Dole convinced the War Department to form the 10th Mountain Division, a mountaineering unit.

Dole appeared as himself on the January 10, 1966 episode of the CBS game show To Tell the Truth. He received three of four possible votes.

Dole died March 14, 1976, in Greenwich, Connecticut.

Legacy
Dole is honored across the ski industry with plaques and other honors.  A trail was dedicated in his honor at Berkshire East Ski Area.  Dole was inducted into the United States National Ski Hall of Fame in 1958.

Notes

References
 Dole, Charles Minot Dole Adventures in Skiing  F Watts (1965)

External links
 Charles M. Dole - U.S. National Ski Hall of Fame
 Charles Minnie Dole - Colorado Ski and Snowboard Hall of Fame
Alpenglow Ski Mountaineering History Project - Gretchen R. Besser - "The National Ski Patrol"

United States Army personnel of World War II
1899 births
1976 deaths
United States Army personnel of World War I
United States Army officers